Agricultural Pumps Complex ( – Mojtame` Tolombeh Hāy Keshāvarzy Pasht Seyl Band) is a village in Howmeh Rural District, in the Central District of Andimeshk County, Khuzestan Province, Iran. At the 2006 census, its population was 32, in 8 families.

References 

Populated places in Andimeshk County